is a Japanese manga artist.

Works
Kyuuketsuki (Manga Newcomers Award)
Bondo ga kiru!
Funafuto Fish Grapple
MÄR Omega
Popcorn Avatar
Aura: Maryūinkōga Saigo no Tatakai

Master
Nobuyuki Anzai

External links
Web Sunday Backstage entries
Official blog
Popcorn Avatar on Club Sunday

Manga artists from Tokyo
Living people
People from Tokyo
Year of birth missing (living people)